Herstmonceux Free Church is a congregational chapel located in Herstmonceux, East Sussex. It was initially constructed at its site on Chapel Row in 1811. The church is a member of the Congregational Federation and has an active membership of around 40 people. The building is grade II listed by English Heritage as a building of special architectural or historical interest.

See also
List of current places of worship in Wealden

References

Congregational churches in East Sussex
Grade II listed churches in East Sussex
Free Church